Saeed Basweidan (born 26 June 1977) is a Yemeni middle-distance runner who competed internationally for Yemen at the 1996 Summer Olympics.

Career
Basweidan was just 19 years old when he competed in the 800 metres at the 1996 Summer Olympics held in Atlanta, United States, he ran in the final heat in round one and finished sixth out of seven runners beating Greg Rhymer from the British Virgin Islands, but still not quick enough to qualify for the next round.

The following year he transferred to Virginia Commonwealth University, where he still holds the school record for 800 metres indoor (1:49.33), which is also a Yemeni national record.

References

External links
 

1977 births
Living people
Yemeni male middle-distance runners
Olympic athletes of Yemen
Athletes (track and field) at the 1996 Summer Olympics